Badahara Dubauliya was a village development committee in Nawalparasi District (now part of Parasi District) in the Lumbini Province of southern Nepal until 2015. At the time of the 1991 Nepal census it had a population of 5,255 people living in 856 individual households.

In the 10 September 2015 administrative reorganization, it became a municipality within Lumbini Province.

References

Populated places in Parasi District